Petr Illarionovich Shelokhonov, (in English also spelled 'Peter' or 'Pyotr' or 'Petr'; 15 August 1929 – 15 September 1999) was a Russian actor, director, filmmaker and socialite, designated Honorable Actor of Russia (1979). A strong proponent of making High culture accessible to all people, he organized social events for all people in artistic communities of St. Petersburg and Moscow using his position as member of the Union of Actors.

Biography

Childhood
Petr Shelokhonov was born in 1929, in Wilno Voivodeship, then a part of Poland; Petr Larionovich Shelokhonov (also known as Peter, Pyotr, or Petro Larionovich Schelochonovich in Belarusian, Polish, Yiddish and Ukrainian). His ancestors originated from Ukraine, from Baltic states, and from Poland.

His father, Larion (Illarion) Titovich Shelokhonov, practiced veterinary medicine and was living at a horse farm, where his grandfather, Tito Shelohonovich, was also a farmer. The revolution and the Russian Civil War brought dramatic changes, so Larion Shelokhonov became a feldsher and practiced medicine raising the son to become a medical doctor. Petr rode horseback during his childhood; he studied biology and medicine under his father's tutelage, spending hours researching cells and tissues using his father's microscope. Petr Shelokhonov was destined to practice medicine, like his father, but his fate was changed by World War II.

World War II
Petr Shelokhonov survived the Nazi occupation during World War II. Following the German and Soviet invasion of Poland and the reshaping of Europe, Poland's borders were redrawn at the insistence of Soviet leader Joseph Stalin, and Petr Shelokhonov's birthplace was incorporated into the Byelorussian Soviet Socialist Republic that was swiftly occupied by German Wehrmacht in the Summer of 1941. One terrible night his home was totally destroyed by Luftwaffe aerial bombing, he miraculously escaped the death by running away barefoot. He then witnessed the fire and destruction of the entire village when the German tanks leveled the remains of his house, then ruined his school and the horse farm. He tried to find his relatives until his cousin told him that there were no survivors. He was unable to find the remains of his mother, Anna Minska, to give her a proper traditional burial. He was separated from his father, who was away with horses. The Nazis arrested Petr but he escaped under heavy gun fire. Petr Shelokhonov was severely wounded in the forehead but he survived and dug a hole in the ground, to hide from Nazi police patrols during the autumn of 1941. There was no food, and people around were dying from starvation. Petr survived thanks to a wounded cow, which was blind and without calves, and her udders were full of milk. Petr used his veterinarian skills and befriended the cow, so he could suck her warm milk. Eventually, the wounded cow died. Then he learned how to explode German grenades to kill fish in a river. While doing that, he was arrested by the partisans patrol and joined the partisans in the woods.

Theatre
In 1942, while surviving in the woods with partisans, Petr Shelokhonov had his first acting experience. He performed parodies of Adolf Hitler and the Nazis for his fellow partisans. His performances helped lift their spirits in a time when they were struggling to survive. This experience accentuated his humble, modest character. The scar on his forehead, the mark of war, made his acting career seem like an impossible dream; but Petr was determined – depending upon his roles he covered his scar with an appropriate theatrical makeup, wore a wig or used various hats. At first, he accompanied himself playing the accordion. Then he made puppets and a screen, and worked in his own puppet theater entertaining people during the war years. In his show, titled "Peter and the Wolf," he managed to lead four puppets with four voices, and also played the accordion. He traveled across Belarus and Ukraine with his puppet theatre and performed for bread and rare food packages from the American airlift. He spoke Polish, Yiddish, Russian, Belarusian, and his native Ukrainian, and he was very lucky to survive until the end of World War II.

Leningrad
In 1945, Petr Shelokhonov became a piano student at the Kiev Conservatory of Music, he also played the accordion on stage, albeit his plan was to become an actor in Leningrad. In 1946, he moved to Leningrad in pursuit of an acting career. Petr Shelokhonov was looking for a job with a jazz band, similar to his favorite bands of Leonid Utyosov and Eddie Rosner, so he joined a jazz band at the Leningrad Navy Club and also gave performances as a stand-up comedian and played the accordion. Pyotr Ilyich Tchaikovsky, Sergei Prokofiev and Sergei Rachmaninov were his favorites as well as the music of Glenn Miller, Louis Armstrong, Frank Sinatra, Ella Fitzgerald and other stars heard on the Voice of America radio shows. Petr's love of music and his passion for acting, which was generously peppered with his free-spirited humor, protected his peaceful soul and positive disposition and helped him survive through the roughest realities of life under Soviet communism; but when his free-spirited humor angered the hard-liners, many doors closed. The city that stood the attack of Hitler's armies and was terribly ruined but not destroyed by the nightmares of war and the siege, where depleted people stood in lines for bread, now Stalin's supporters resumed purges. In 1946, the persecution of creative intellectuals began, so publishers, magazines, and theaters were closed. In the war-ravaged and repressed city, new people from all over poured in and with fresh forces, they attempted to restore normal life. But under Stalin's regime, Petr Shelokhonov was detained by the Soviet authorities and was forced to work hard labour for several months on the construction grounds for the Kirov Stadium in Leningrad until he was drafted in the Soviet Navy.

Baltic Sea
In 1949, Petr Shelokhonov was conscripted in the Soviet Armed Forces in Leningrad, and then he served in the Red Navy for five years. Petr began his service as a seaman part of the crew in charge of smoke screen devices on ships of the Baltic Fleet. There he was soon arrested for telling a political joke. Petr was detained for several days at the strict guardhouse – military detention facility. That experience did not break his will, as he used humor to survive. From 1949 to 1954 he served in the Soviet Navy stationed in Kaliningrad, Klaipėda and Liepaja. Peter eventually moved up from a sailor to actor with the Theatre of the Baltic Fleet in the city of Liepaja. There he delivered many radio and stage performances, earning critical acclaim and an Honorable Note from the Republic of Latvia. In 1952, in Liepaja, he did a great job at the gala concert of the Baltic Fleet delivering exceptional performance and attracting the attention of Admirals Kharlamov and Golovko, and not only them. Petr noticed being followed. He was "caught" in the radio room listening to foreign radio stations - Frank Sinatra's voice. At that time Stalin ordered radio jamming of foreign radio stations throughout the USSR, but there was no radio interference on the sea, and the sailors listened to prohibited radio broadcasts. Listening to "enemy voices" was then a serious accusation. Petr Shelokhonov was punished again for telling political jokes and for listening to foreign radio stations, such as the Voice of America and the BBC. Listening to foreign radio stations was considered anti-soviet activity, a punishable crime in the Soviet Union during the Cold War. 

But even after the guardhouse, again and again, as if spellbound, he continued to listen to his favorite music on the radio: Frank Sinatra, Bing Crosby, Glenn Miller, Louis Armstrong, Ella Fitzgerald, and understood that the big world lives a different life, that is full of joy and happiness. In 1954, Petr Shelokhonov was discharged from the Red Navy and applied to the Leningrad State Institute of Theatre, Music, and Cinema, but the school refused to accept him because of his scarred face and bad anti-soviet record. Peter's free-spirited humor only angered the hard-liners, so for him, many doors closed.

Siberia
After that, Petr's acting career was limited to Siberia, where he remained under suspicion as did many other survivors who were held by the Nazis in occupied territory during World War II. He managed to survive through the roughest realities of life under Soviet communism; but he did not stop telling funny political jokes about the Soviet leadership, so when his free spirited humor angered the hard liners, many doors closed. He moved to the Siberian city of Irkutsk and studied acting at the Irkutsk drama school, graduating in 1960, as actor. Petr Shelokhonov was member of the Irkutsk State Drama Theater from 1957 to 1962. There he created a variety of characters ranging from Soviet working class heroes to Hamlet in Shakespeare's play.

Chekhov's theatre
From 1962 to 1968, Petr Shelokhonov worked as an actor and director at the Chekhov Drama Theatre in the city of Taganrog, Russia. There Shelokhonov created leading roles in several new productions of such classic plays by Anton Chekhov as Uncle Vanya in Uncle Vanya, Ivanov in Ivanov, Tuzenbach in Three Sisters, and Treplev in The Seagull. In The Cherry Orchard, which he co-directed, he also played two opposing characters on different nights, alternating between the roles as Gayev, and as Lopakhin. Shelokhonov also appeared as Satin in The Lower Depths by Maxim Gorky and as Derzhavin in Friends and Years by Leonid Zorin. His favorite role of that period was Platonov in the eponymous play by Anton Chekhov. In 1967, for the 50th anniversary of the Russian revolution of 1917, Shelokhonov was ordered by the Soviet Communist party to portray Lenin in several productions, an order no one could object in the Soviet Union. So, Shelokhonov portrayed Lenin in the style of satire, which angered the communists, but made common viewers smile.

Moscow
In 1967, Petr Shelokhonov made his TV debut in Moscow appearing in the leading role as Unknown Soldier in the TV movie Steps to the Sun (Shagi v Solntse) which premiered in the USSR on Soviet Central Television in 1967. Successful appearances on television made Petr Shelokhonov known to major film studios and soon he made his big-screen debut in the film titled " Hidden Enemy - No Amnesty" (1968) appearing as Soviet police officer who was a foreign spy. Petr Shelokhonov played a good-looking spy, who was surreptitiously killing people and infiltrating the Soviet rank and file wearing a Soviet police uniform. The film release coincided with the real attack on the Soviet leader Leonid Brezhnev by an armed man who penetrated the Kremlin wearing a Soviet uniform. Brezhnev's police Chief N.A.Schelokov wrote an angry letter to the Soviet Communist Party demanding that this "anti-Soviet" film must be banned. Immediately the film was banned and Petr Shelokhonov was censored. Then the film was altered and re-made for release later in 1969 under the new film title, "Amnesty Not Possible", but it was also banned and all existing printed copies and the original camera negative were destroyed by the Soviets. The replacement film was produced under the supervision of the Soviet KGB and was titled Razvyazka (1969). In it the spy, played again by Petr Shelokhonov, is wearing a white shirt instead of a Soviet uniform, because the Soviet KGB ordered the filmmakers to do so.

In June 1969, the Chief of Soviet State Police (N.A.Shchelokov) wrote: 

Censored by the Soviet Government, Petr Shelokhonov experienced hard times. In 1970, he was recommended by film director Sergei Gerasimov for the portrayal of Sergei Korolev, the legendary rocket scientist who launched the first man in space, but state censors refused him the job. The film title was Taming of the Fire (Ukroshcheniye ognya) but Shelokhonov was banned from playing the leading role by Soviet censor. The leading role eventually went to his fellow actor Kirill Lavrov and Shelokhonov played a supporting role having such film partners as Innokenty Smoktunovsky, Igor Gorbachyov, Yevgeni Matveev, Zinovi Gerdt, Igor Vladimirov, Vera Kuznetsova, Andrei Popov and other notable Russian actors.

The film Taming of the Fire revealed for the first time some details of the top-secret Soviet missile program that was developing behind the Iron Curtain. At that time Soviet political censors had total domination over the filmmakers. Filming locations in the Soviet Union were top secret, such as the Baykonur Cosmodrome in Kazakhstan and the Gagarin Space Center near Moscow. Soviet military censors watched the secret equipment and rocket science machinery that was disallowed, so several scenes with good acting were deleted and destroyed. The total length of destroyed footage was well over a thousand meters of film, so the released version of the film was reduced by one hour. Several scenes with performances by Petr Shelokhonov and other actors were also censored and destroyed.

Leningrad
In 1968, Petr Shelokhonov moved back to Leningrad. There he became a member of the troupe at Lenkom Theatre, then he joined the troupe at Lensovet Theatre, and then became permanent member of the troupe at Komissarjevsky Theatre. During the 1970s, 1980s and 1990s he created a number of leading roles in popular stage productions in Leningrad, such as Nikita Romanovich in trilogy about Russian Tsars: Death of Ivan the Terrible, Tsar Boris, and Tsar Fedor Ioannovich by Aleksei Tolstoy. Petr Shelokhonov was critically acclaimed for his performance in the leading roles as Sudakov in Gnezdo Glukharya by Viktor Rozov, as Dmitri Nikolaevich in Theme and Variations by Aleksei Arbuzov, and as Johansson in Antiquariat by Annie Pukkemaa. His most memorable TV performances were such roles as Laptev in Chekhov's Three Years, as Corporal Vaskov in Dawns are quiet here by Boris Vasilyev, and as Batmanov in Far from Moscow (Daleko ot Moskvy) by Vasily Azhaev. At that time Shelokhonov was also cast in films made by Lenfilm Studios, Odessa Film Studio, Kiev Dovzhenko Film Studios, Mosfilm and Sverdlovsk film studios. Petr Shelokhonov shone in a range of leading and supporting roles such as Cossack Severian Ulybin in 1971 epic film Dauriya and as spy Sotnikov in the 1969 detective drama Razvyazka. He also portrayed a variety of historical figures, leaders and intellectuals, on stage and in film, such as the Russian composer Mikhail Glinka, Academician Ivan Sechenov, revolutionaries Lenin and Dorogomilov. In 1974 Shelokhonov played the leading role as industrialist Peresada, opposite another Russian film star Natalia Fateeva, in political drama Reprisal (Otvetnaya mera) based on real historic events of the cold war.

St. Petersburg
In 1989, writer and director Peter Ustinov invited Petr Shelokhonov to play the leading role, as Sam, in his autobiographical play Photo Finish, which was staged and directed by Peter Ustinov in St. Petersburg at the Lensovet Theatre. In that production, Petr Shelokhonov gave a critically acclaimed performance with the support of an ensemble of his stage acting partners, such as, Yelena Solovey, Roman Gromadsky, Anna Aleksakhina, and other notable Russian actors. The production ran more than 100 performances spanning three seasons from 1989 to 1992.

In 1993, Petr Shelokhonov directed a stage production of the American play Isabella by Irving A. Leitner, about Jewish girl, Isabella Katz Leitner, who survived the Auschwitz concentration camp. The production had an innovative and life-affirming final scene in which the victims of the Nazis are seen emerging from the burning ovens of Auschwitz. One by one, they slowly walk across the stage to symbolically join the living audience, accompanied by the music from Mozart's Requiem.

In his directing as well as in his acting Petr Shelokhonov used his own experience as a WWII survivor.

In 1996, Petr Shelokhonov was cast by Marion Dougherty to perform opposite Sophie Marceau, James Fox, and Sean Bean in Anna Karenina (1997 film) by director Bernard Rose. The film based on the 1877 novel of the same name by Leo Tolstoy became the only international production filmed entirely in Russia, on locations in Saint Petersburg and Moscow.

Recognition

Petr Shelokhonov was loved by the public, despite hard times with Soviet officials. He played leading and supporting roles in Russian and international films, and his filmography includes over 80 roles in film and on television. His film partners were such actors as Kirill Lavrov, Alisa Freindlich, Yefim Kopelyan, Pavel Luspekayev, Ivan I. Krasko, Igor Gorbachyov, Nikolai Gritsenko, Vitali Solomin, Natalya Fateyeva, Imre Sinkovits, James Fox, Sophie Marceau, Sean Bean, and other notable actors. He also played over 100 roles on stage in Russian and international theater productions and was a member of three theatre companies in Leningrad – St. Petersburg. Petr Shelokhonov received honors from the republic of Latvia (1952) and was designated Honorable Actor of Russia (1979). He died in 1999 and was laid to rest in St. Petersburg, Russia. The book about him is titled "My best friend Petr Shelokhonov" by actor Ivan I. Krasko was published in 2009, to commemorate the 80th anniversary of the actor, and other books about him were published in Russia, in Europe, and in the USA.

Filmography

Actor 
 1967: Shagi v Solntse – as Unknown soldier
 1968: Tri goda by Chekhov – as Aleksei Fedorovich Laptev
 1968: Hidden Enemy - as Soviet police officer
 1969: Rokirovka v dlinnuyu storonu – as Scientist
 1969: Razvyazka – as Spy Vladimir Sotnikov
 1970: Franz Liszt. Dreams of love   – as Mikhail Glinka, Russian composer
 1970: Lyubov Yarovaya  – as Mazukhin
 1970: Dawns are quiet here – as Sergeant Vaskov
 1970: Far from Moscow (Daleko ot Moskvy) – as Manager Batmanov
 1971: Night on the 14th Parallel – as Editor
 1971: Dauria – as Cossack Severian Ulybin
 1971: Shutite? – as Chairman
 1971: Kholodno – goryacho – as Writer Anton Podorozhny
 1972: "Taming of the fire"  – as Michael Karelin, rocket scientist
 1972: Grossmeyster – as Stepfather
 1972: Such a long, long road – as Captain
 1973: Opoznanie – as Colonel
 1974: Amra – as Khasarman, Amra's father
 1974: "Reprisal"  – as Sergei Ivanovich Peresada
 1975: Obretesh v boyu – as Nikolai Sergeev
 1975: Troil and Kressida (TV) – as King Agamemnon
 1976: Menya eto ne kasaetsa – as Detective Pankatov
 1976: Trust – as Petrovsky
 1976: Vitali Bianki – as Presenter-Narrator
 1977: First joy – as Dorogomilov
 1978: Kamyshy – as Detective 

 1978: Vsyo reshaet mgnovenie – as Matveev, Director of Sport
 1978: Full Circle – as Professor-Psychiatrist from St. Petersburg
 1979: Extraordinary summer – as Dorogomilov
 1979: Puteshestvie v drugoi gorod – as Fedor Ignatevich
 1980: Zhizn i priklyucheniya chetyrekh druzei 1/2  – as Forest ranger
 1980: Late rendez-vous – as Lena's father
 1981: Zhizn i priklyucheniya chetyrekh druzei 3/4 – as Forest ranger
 1981: "Pravda Lieutenanta Klimova" – as Nikolai Chervonenko
 1981: 20 December – as Lawyer Zarudny
 1981: Devushka i Grand – as Director of Sport
 1981: Sindikat 2.– as Agent Fomichev
 1981: It was beyond the Narva gates – as Gregory
 1982: Customs – as Chief customs officer
 1982: Niccolò Paganini  – Voice
 1982: God aktivnogo solntsa – as School suprviser
 1982: Liszt Ferenc – as Count Vielgorsky
 1982: Golos – as Production Director
 1982: Fifth decade – as Vasili Nikitich
 1983: Magistral – as Gadalov
 1983: Mesto deistviya – as Mayor Ivan Ryabov
 1984: Zaveshchanie professora Douela – Cameo
 1984: Two versions of one collision – as Diplomat Gordin
 1985: Sofia Kovalevskaya – as Ivan Sechenov
 1985: Sopernitsy – as Coach Semenich
 1985: Kontract of the century – as Government Minister
 1985: Rassleduet Brigada Bychkova – Detective Officer
 1986: The last road – as Doctor Stefanovich
 1986: "Red arrow" – as Manager Yusov
 1987: Sreda obitaniya – as Director
 1987: Vezuchiy chelovek – as Manager
 1987: Moonzund – as Captain Andreev
 1988: "Khleb – Imya suschestvitelnoe" – as Blacksmith Akimych
 1991: "My best friend, General Vasili, son of Joseph Stalin" – as Colonel Savinykh
 1992: Richard II – as Lord Marshal
 1996: Passazhirka – as Passenger
 1997: Anna Karenina, a 1997 film by Bernard Rose starring Sophie Marceau. – as Kapitonich, Karenin's butler

Stage works

Actor
 1997: Passenger – as Passenger
 1994: Barefoot in the Park – as Victor Velasco
 1993: Antiquariat by :fi:Anneli Pukema – as Johansson
 1992: Murder of Gonzago – as King Gonzago
 1989: Photo Finish by Peter Ustinov – as Sam
 1988: The Land of Promise by W. Somerset Maugham – as Mr. Wikham
 1986: Round table under lamp – as Slepokhin
 1985: A Grand Piano in the Sea
 1983: Last Summer in Chulimsk by Alexander Vampilov – as Pomigalov
 1980: Fifth decade – as Fedor Nikitich
 1980: Theme and Variations – as Dmitri Nikolaevich
 1978: Gnezdo glukharia ( – as Sudakov
 1977: Tsar Boris – as Mitropolite Job
 1976: Tsar Fédor Ivanovitch – as Prince Golitsyn
 1974: Death of Ivan the Terrible – as Nikita Romanovich Zakharin-Yuriev
 1970: Far from Moscow (aka.. Daleko ot Moskvy) – as Batmanov
 1970: Dawns are quiet here ( – as Sergeant Vaskov
 1969: Cyrano de Bergerac ( – as Montfleury, Jodelet
 1967:  In the name of Revolution – as Lenin
 1967: Lecture by Lenin – as Lenin
 1967: The Cherry Orchard – as Gayev, as Lopakhin
 1967: Three Sisters – as Tuzenbach
 1966: Platonov – as Michael Platonov
 1966: The night of Moon eclipse – as Dervish Divana
 1966: The Seagull (" – as Treplev
 1965: Obelisque  – as Peter
 1965: Ivanov  – as Ivanov
 1964: Uncle Vania – as Uncle Vanya
 1964: "104 pages about love"
 1964: Grave accusation ( – Male lead
 1963: The Lower Depths – as Satin
 1963: Armoured train 14–69 – as Vaska Pepel
 1963: Friends and Years – as Derzhavin
 1963: Ocean (" – as Captain Platonov
 1962: Ocean (" – as Captain Chasovnikov
 1961: Golden Boy – as Joe Bonaparte, the Golden Boy
 1961: Credit with Nibelungen
 1960: An Irkutsk story – as Victor, as Denis
 1960: Dubrovsky – as Dubrovsky
 1959: A little student – as Larisov
 1958: Hamlet – as Hamlet
 1957: Poem of bread – as Senya

Director of theatre

1993 – Isabella (play by Irving A. Leitner)
1968 – Platonov (play by A. Chekhov)
1967 – Lectures of Lenin (play by M. Shatrov)
1967 – Girls from the street of hope (play by A. Mamlin)
1966 – Obelisque (play by A. Mamlin)
1965 – Ivanov (play by A. Chekhov)
1965 – Shadowboxing (play by B. Tour)
1964 - 104 pages about love (play by Edvard Radzinsky)
1964 – Sacred night (play by A. Chavrin)
1963 – Friends and years (play by L. Zorin)

Honors
 1979: Honorable Actor of Russia SFSR
 1952: Honorary Letter from the Government of Latvia for outstanding performance on stage.

Sources
 Book "My best friend Petr Shelokhonov" (2009, Russian) by actor Ivan I. Krasko – Saint Petersburg, Russia: SOLO Publishing, 2009. 
 Biography of Petr Shelokhonov (Russian) by film critic Dmitri Ivaneev
 Lenfilm Studios personal file on film actor Peter Shelokhonov.
 Petr Shelokhonov at the IMDb:
 Petr Shelokhonov (Russian Encyclopedia: Петр Шелохонов)
 Petr Shelokhonov (Russian: Петр Шелохонов)
 Petr Shelokhonov (Russian: Петр Шелохонов) in Russian source: Stranitsy russkoĭ literatury serediny deviatnadtsatogo veka By M. L. Semanova, Page 172
 Publications in THEATER magazine 1961–1996
 Publications in TEATRALHAYA ZHIZN magazine 1959–1994
 Publications in SOVETSKY EKRAN magazine 1969–1992
 Petr Shelokhonov's father (Russian: И. Шелохонов) in Russian source: Page 22 in Kooperativno-kolkhoznoe stroitelʹstvo v Belorusskoĭ SSR, 1917–1927 gg ... By Mikhail Pavlovich. Published by "Nauka i tekhnika" 1980

References

External links
 Petr Shelokhonov Website 
 

Russian male film actors
Soviet male film actors
Belarusian male film actors
Male actors from Saint Petersburg
1929 births
1999 deaths
20th-century Belarusian male actors
Belarusian male stage actors
Mass media people from Saint Petersburg
Russian people of Belarusian descent
20th-century Russian male actors
Honored Artists of the RSFSR